The men's 400 metres hurdles event at the 2001 Summer Universiade was held at the Workers Stadium in Beijing, China on 30–31 August.

Medalists

Results

Heats
Held on 30 August

Semifinals
Held on 31 August

Final
Held on 31 August

References

Athletics at the 2001 Summer Universiade
2001